USS Pinon (AN-66/YN-87) was a  which was assigned to protect U.S. Navy ships and harbors during World War II with her anti-submarine nets.

Constructed in Wilmington, Delaware 
Pinon (AN-66), a net tender, was laid down 9 March 1943 by American Car and Foundry Company, Wilmington, Delaware, as YN–87; launched 16 January 1944; designated Pinon (AN-66) 20 January 1944; and commissioned 31 March 1944.

World War II service
After Atlantic coast shakedown and training, Pinon stood out of New York Harbor 24 June 1944 and steamed for Belfast, Northern Ireland, arriving 10 July. Pinon provided net-tending service in both Belfast and Plymouth, England, through the fall.

Departing Plymouth 6 November, she put in at Norfolk, Virginia 21 November through 10 December. She then underwent availability at Curtis Bay, Baltimore, Maryland, 11 December through 25 January 1945.
 
Pinon called at Hampton Roads, Virginia, 31 January and then cruised via Guantanamo Bay and the Panama Canal, reporting for duty to Commander, Pacific 13 February. After availability at San Diego, California, 19 March, she called at Pearl Harbor and thence tended nets at Eniwetok commencing 22 April, at Guam (27 April through 20 June), at Tinian/Saipan through the first week of July, and at Okinawa until 15 October.

Post-war inactivation

Calling at Pearl Harbor 12 December, she pushed on to San Diego, California, arriving two days before Christmas. Pinon decommissioned at San Diego 5 March 1946, and was struck from the Navy List 20 March 1946. Sold and placed in merchant service as Alaska Reefer, she was lost at sea 28 August 1961.

References 

  
 NavSource Online: Service Ship Photo Archive - YN-87 / AN-66 Pinon

 

1944 ships
Ailanthus-class net laying ships of the United States Navy
American Car and Foundry Company
Ships built in Wilmington, Delaware
Shipwrecks
World War II net laying ships of the United States